Ian McKeever may refer to:

Ian McKeever (artist)  (born 1946), British artist
Ian McKeever (mountaineer)  (1970–2013), Irish mountaineer